Darada is a rural locality (a selo) in Darada-Muradinsky Selsoviet, Gergebilsky District, Republic of Dagestan, Russia. The population was 217 as of 2010. There are 6 streets.

Geography 
Darada is located 24 km southwest of Gergebil (the district's administrative centre) by road. Maali and Murada are the nearest rural localities.

References 

Rural localities in Gergebilsky District